Kimmo Eronen (born September 7, 1971 in Turku, Finland) is a professional Finnish ice hockey player who split the 2009–10 season with Jokerit in the SM-liiga and TuTo and KooKoo of the Mestis.  Since beginning his professional career in 1992, Eronen has also played in the Swedish Elitserien and Danish AL-Bank Ligaen.

References

External links

1971 births
Living people
Finnish ice hockey defencemen
Frölunda HC players
Ilves players
Jokerit players
KooKoo players
Lukko players
HC TPS players
TuTo players
Sportspeople from Turku